Chamoyada is a sweet and spicy type of shaved ice, or raspado, drink prepared with fruit and flavored with chamoy. It is a part of Mexican cuisine, and is also common in regions of the United States with significant Mexican-American populations. The drink is most commonly prepared with mango sorbet or mango-flavored shaved ice, and thus is sometimes also called a mangonada or chamango.

The drink is essentially a combination of chamoy sauce, shaved ice (or ice cream or sorbet, depending on the preparation), chili powder, and fruit chunks. In certain variations, a whole fruit popsicle, or paleta, is added to the drink and mixed with the shaved ice. The drinking straws served with chamoyadas often have tamarind candy on the outside.

Different flavors of chamoyadas can include fruits like mango, lemon, guava, tamarind, pineapple, and strawberry.

See also
 Cholado
 Halo-halo

References

Where to find chamango, the chilled Mexican fruit drink, in L.A.. Los Angeles Times. May 12, 2015.
There’s a cool taste of Mexico in University City. The Charlotte Observer. September 26, 2014.
Paletas: Authentic Recipes for Mexican Ice Pops, Shaved Ice & Aguas Frescas - Page 80
Business Beat: A new, sweet, savory spot in Modesto. The Modesto Bee. November 14, 2014.

Non-alcoholic drinks
Mexican drinks